Chalyboclydon is a genus of moths in the family Geometridae.

Species
Chalyboclydon flexilinea Warren, 1898
Chalyboclydon marginata Warren, 1893

References

External links
Natural History Museum Lepidoptera genus database

Larentiinae
Glossata genera